Mohammad Ali Asghari (born 3 March 1954) is an Iranian football administrator, who was the chairman of the Zob Ahan FC from 23 August 2011 to 13 September 2013. He was vice chairman of the club from 2009 to 2011.

See also
Zob Ahan F.C.

References

1952 births
Living people
Iranian football chairmen and investors
Zob Ahan Esfahan F.C.